Stacey Borgman (born April 23, 1975) is an American rower. She competed at the 2004 Summer Olympics in Athens, in the women's lightweight double sculls. Borgman was born in Homer, Alaska.

She graduated from Barnard College in 1998 and was inducted into Columbia University's hall of fame in 2008.

References

1975 births
Living people
American female rowers
Olympic rowers of the United States
Rowers at the 2004 Summer Olympics
World Rowing Championships medalists for the United States
Columbia Lions rowers
Barnard College alumni
21st-century American women